Italian Grand Prix can refer to:

Italian Grand Prix, a Formula One motor race
Italian motorcycle Grand Prix
Speedway Grand Prix of Italy